Ulises Infante Azocar (born 8 April 1987) is a Swedish rapper best known under the artist name Stor. Azocar grew up in Huddinge outside of Stockholm with his mother and siblings. His parents are Chilean who fled to Sweden in 1976. his father is the Chilean poet Sergio Infante and his grandfather is the poet Rubén Azocar. Azocar is a member of the hiphop music collective AYLA which consists of Azocar  Carlito, Mohammed Ali and their producer Mack Beats.

Career
Azocar released his debut music album in 2009 called Nya skolans ledare, which he got awarded a P3 Guld award for in the category Hiphop/soul of the Year. On the album he collaborates with rapper Petter, Dan Jah, Promoe and Adam Tensta. Azocar collaborates with Petter on his album En räddare i nöden (2010), where he and Petter performs on the single Vem är Stor?.

Besides Nya skolans ledare Azocar has also released the mixtape called Dikter ifrån bikten, amongst other there are the song Där ni ser mig. Azocar has released the song 2 Lurar with the music group Teddybears (2009). On 30 November 2010, the song Stationen was released by Ison & Fille where Azocar participates. On 9 November 2018 he released the music single  Rom & Kush with rapper Linda Pira. On 3 May 2013, Azocar released the album Shere Khan XIII where Linda Pira, Aki and Dani M also collaborates.

On 28 May 2015, he released the song  Swish along with  Linda Pira, Gee Dixon & Bamma B.

On 19 May 2016, the musicvideo to the song Svartskallar was put on YouTube. The video makes references to historical slave roles were the actors Helena af Sandeberg and Jonas Malmsjö plays the roles of slaves and where Linda Pira, Cherrie, Fanny Jernström, Ali Sabriye and Teddy Vidal plays upper-class people. On 18 November 2016, he and  Seinabo Sey released the song Vägen hem together.

On 9 June 2017, he released his third music album called Under broarna, an album influenced by his experiences with the city of Stockholm and the Chilean poet Pablo Neruda. In 2018, he participated in the show Så mycket bättre along with several other Swedish singers, the show is broadcast on TV4.

Discography

Singles

References

Swedish hip hop musicians
1987 births
Living people
Singers from Stockholm
21st-century Swedish singers
Swedish rappers